Onin is a minor Austronesian language of the Onin Peninsula of Bomberai, Indonesian Papua. Despite the small number of speakers, it is the basis of a local pidgin.

References

Central Malayo-Polynesian languages
Languages of western New Guinea